Diogo Rodrigues Siston, or simply Siston (born January 25, 1981 in Rio de Janeiro), is a Brazilian-Portuguese football midfielder who currently plays for Olaria Atlético Clube. 
He played in Brazil national team U-15, U-17 and U-20. During this period he was teammate of players like Ronaldinho, Kaka, Adriano, Maicon and others famous players.

At his peak of his professional career in Brazil  he played in Vasco da Gama with big names of world football like Romário, Bebeto and others. In Europe his peak of career was for Greek clubs including Aris Thessaloniki, Levadeiakos and Ionikos.

References

1981 births
Brazilian footballers
Brazilian expatriate footballers
Brazilian people of Spanish descent
Association football midfielders
Living people
CR Vasco da Gama players
Aris Thessaloniki F.C. players
Levadiakos F.C. players
Hapoel Be'er Sheva F.C. players
C.D. Santa Clara players
Macaé Esporte Futebol Clube players
Olaria Atlético Clube players
Liga Portugal 2 players
Super League Greece players
Expatriate footballers in Israel
Expatriate footballers in Greece
Brazil under-20 international footballers
Footballers from Rio de Janeiro (city)